Shakeem "Shak" Adams (born September 7, 1998) is an American soccer player who currently plays for USL League One side North Carolina FC.

Playing career

Youth, college and amateur
Shak played youth soccer at Tennessee Soccer Club, before playing college soccer at Florida Gulf Coast University from 2016 to 2019. During his time with the Eagles, Adams made 71 appearances, scoring 23 goals and tallying 16 assists.

Whilst at college, Adams played in the USL League Two with Nashville SC U23 in 2017 and Seattle Sounders FC U-23 in 2019.

MLS SuperDraft
On January 13, 2020, Adams was selected 54th overall in the 2020 MLS SuperDraft by Nashville SC. However, he was released by the club in late February.

FC Tucson
On February 27, 2020, Adams signed with USL League One side FC Tucson. He made his professional debut on July 25, 2020, appearing as a 70th-minute substitute in a 2-1 win over Fort Lauderdale CF.

Charleston Battery
On January 20, 2022, Adams made the move to USL Championship side Charleston Battery. Following the 2022 season, Adams was released by Charleston.

North Carolina FC (loan)
On July 8, 2022, Adams was loaned to USL League One club North Carolina FC for the remainder of the 2022 season. Adams made his debut for North Carolina on July 9, 2022, during a 1-1 draw with Union Omaha.

North Carolina FC
On December 16, 2022, it was announced Adams would join North Carolina FC on a permanent basis for the 2023 season.

References 

1998 births
American soccer players
Association football forwards
North Carolina FC players
Charleston Battery players
FC Tucson players
Florida Gulf Coast Eagles men's soccer players
Seattle Sounders FC U-23 players
Living people
Nashville SC draft picks
People from Antioch, Tennessee
Soccer players from Tennessee
USL League One players
USL League Two players